Trochaclis antarctica is a species of sea snail, a marine gastropod mollusk in the family Ataphridae.

Description
The length of the shell varies between 2 mm and 5 mm.

Distribution
This species occurs in Antarctic waters off the South Sandwich Islands, the South Shetlands, the Antarctic Peninsula, the Ross Sea and the Weddell Sea.

References

 Engl W. (2012) Shells of Antarctica. Hackenheim: Conchbooks. 402 pp.

External links
 Intergovernmental Oceanographic Commission (IOC) of UNESCO. The Ocean Biogeographic Information System (OBIS)
 Southern Ocean Mollusc Database (SOMBASE)
  Discovery Reports, National Institute of Oceanography of Great Britain, vol. 26, 1951, p. 111

Ataphridae
Gastropods described in 1912